The Arrondissement of Arlon is one of the five administrative arrondissements in the Walloon province of Luxembourg, Belgium. It is an administrative arrondissement not to be confused with the exctint judicial arrondissement of Arlon, also comprising the municipalities of the Arrondissement of Virton.

Municipalities
The Administrative Arrondissement of Arlon consists of the following municipalities:
 Arlon
 Attert
 Aubange
 Martelange
 Messancy

References

See also
 Arelerland

Arlon